Jakob Modalsli (1 April 1911 – 31 January 1984) was a Norwegian civil servant.

He was born in Strømm, and graduated from the Norwegian College of Agriculture in 1936. In 1947, he was hired as secretary general of the Norwegian Agrarian Association; in 1949 he became director of the Direktoratet for eksport- og importregulering. From 1952 to 1960 and 1962 to 1966 he was the permanent under-secretary of state in the Ministry of Defence. From 1966 to 1981 he was the County Governor of Østfold. From 1973 to 1977 he was the chair of the Norwegian Agency for Development Cooperation.

References

1911 births
1984 deaths
People from Svelvik
Norwegian College of Agriculture alumni
Norwegian civil servants
Directors of government agencies of Norway
County governors of Norway